The Gunavidji people, also written Kunibidji and Kunibídji and also known as the Ndjébbana, are an Aboriginal Australian people of Arnhem Land in the Northern Territory.

Language

The Gunavidji speak Ndjébbana, which is one of the Maningrida languages.

Country
Their main base is at Maningrida township.

Cultural practices
They do not practise circumcision.

Alternative names
 Gunaviji.
 Gunawitji.
 Gunabidji.
 Gunabwidji.
 Gunjibidji.
 Witji.

Notes

Citations

Sources

Aboriginal peoples of the Northern Territory
Arnhem Land